Neil Duram is an American politician from Montana. Duram is a Republican member of Montana House of Representatives from District 2.

Career 
On November 6, 2018, Duram won the election unopposed and became a Republican member of Montana House of Representatives for District 2.

Personal life 
Duram lives in Eureka, Montana.

See also 
 Montana House of Representatives, District 2

References

External links 
 Rep. Neil Duram at leg.mt.gov
 Neil Duram at ballotpedia.org
 Neil Duram at meic.org
 Neil Duram at followthemoney.org

Living people
Republican Party members of the Montana House of Representatives
People from Eureka, Montana
21st-century American politicians
1969 births